Woodrush High School is a mixed secondary school and sixth form located in the parish of Wythall in the English county of Worcestershire.

Woodrush High School offers GCSEs, BTECs and Cambridge Nationals as programmes of study for pupils, while students in the sixth form have the option to study from a range of A-levels and further BTECs. As of 2018, the school also started enrolling higher ability students onto the Mandarin Excellence programme.

As of the most recent Ofsted inspection published in January 2019, the school has 1002 enrolled pupils, 96 of whom are in the Sixth Form. In this inspection the school were graded overall 'good' with 'outstanding' leadership and management and 'outstanding' behaviour.

School history
Established in 1958, it later became a foundation school administered by Worcestershire County Council. In July 2011 Woodrush High School converted to academy status, but continues to coordinate with Worcestershire County Council for admissions.

In November 2019, the school was close to shutting down due to a faulty boiler. Parents had attempted to fundraise through a GoFundMe page however the matter was resolved after Sajid Javid, Bromsgrove MP and Chancellor of the Exchequer, visited the school. This led to the Department for Education providing an emergency fund for the school.

In March 2020, the school was forced to temporarily close due to government guidelines surrounding COVID-19.

Academic success
In 2018/19 exams 44% of the pupils obtained a level 5 grade or higher in both English and Maths GCSEs, 1% higher than the national average and an improvement by 1% from the 2017/18 exams. Overall, 62 grade 9s were received with 11 in History, 9 in Chemistry and 7 in Maths. Also, last year, students from the sixth form achieved 41% A* to C grades along with a 100% pass rate.

School awards
2010 - 2013 British Council International School Award
2015 - 2016 Discovering Democracy Award
2016 Prince's Teaching Institute - Geography
2016 Prince's Teaching Institute - History
St John Ambulance School Mark
The Healthy Schools Award
Silver Eco Schools Award

Notable former pupils
Nick Rhodes, musician
Eniola Aluko, footballer
Sone Aluko, footballer 
Parry Glasspool, actor
Devon Winters, musician and actor AKA Su Yaka

References

External links
Woodrush High School official website

Secondary schools in Worcestershire
Educational institutions established in 1958
1958 establishments in England
Academies in Worcestershire